Ole Sverre Nafstad (born 20 February 1946 in Bærum, Akershus) is a Norwegian competition rower and Olympic medalist.

Nafstad competed at the 1971 European Rowing Championships and won a silver medal with the coxless four. He competed at the 1972 Summer Olympics in Munich in the coxless four and the team was eliminated in the round one repêchage. At the 1973 European Rowing Championships in Moscow, he competed in the coxless pair and they won bronze. He received a silver medal in coxless four at the 1976 Summer Olympics in Montreal, together with Finn Tveter, Rolf Andreassen, and Arne Bergodd.

He represented the club Bærum RK. He resides at Kolsås.

References

External links

Norwegian male rowers
Olympic rowers of Norway
Olympic silver medalists for Norway
Rowers at the 1972 Summer Olympics
Rowers at the 1976 Summer Olympics
Sportspeople from Bærum
1946 births
Living people
Olympic medalists in rowing
Medalists at the 1976 Summer Olympics
European Rowing Championships medalists